Luke James Cundle (born 26 April 2002) is an English footballer who plays for Swansea City on loan from Wolverhampton Wanderers as a midfielder.

Career
Cundle made his first team debut for Wolverhampton Wanderers, whose academy he had progressed from, on 25 September 2019 as a substitute in a EFL Cup victory against Reading. He had been part of the club's pre-season tour of China, where he played in the Premier League Asia Trophy Final victory against Manchester City.

Cundle made his second senior appearance for Wolves as a second-half substitute in a 4–0 away win over Nottingham Forest in the EFL Cup 2nd round on 24 August 2021.

Cundle made his third senior appearance for Wolves as a late substitute in a 3–0 victory over Sheffield United at Molineux in the 3rd round of the 2021–22 FA Cup on 9 January 2022. On 15 January 2022, he made his Premier League debut, when he appeared as a stoppage time substitute in a 3–1 win over Southampton at Molineux.

Cundle made his full debut in the Premier League in 2–0 win away to Tottenham Hotspur on 13 February 2022.

Career statistics

References

External links

2002 births
Living people
English footballers
Association football midfielders
Wolverhampton Wanderers F.C. players
Premier League players